Cho Dong-kee (born May 21, 1971) is a retired South Korean professional basketball player lastly with the KBL team Ulsan Mobis Automons.

Achievements

Individual
2001: Korean KBL All-Star Game

References

1971 births
Living people
Centers (basketball)
Chung-Ang University alumni
Korean Basketball League players
Sportspeople from Ulsan
South Korean basketball coaches
South Korean men's basketball players
Ulsan Hyundai Mobis Phoebus players
Basketball players at the 1996 Summer Olympics
Olympic basketball players of South Korea
Pungyang Jo clan